Karluk or Qarluq may refer to:

Alaska
 Karluk River, a river on Kodiak Island in Alaska, USA.
 Karluk, Alaska, a town at the mouth of the Karluk River
 Karluk Airport
 HMCS Karluk, a ship crushed and sunk by Arctic ice in January 1914.

Asia
 Karluk languages, spoken in Central Asia and Western China
 Karluks (also known as Qarluqs), a Turkic pastoral and agricultural tribe in Central Asia
 Karluk yabghu, a polity ruled by Karluk tribes in the 8th-9th centuries.
 Qarluq, Uzbekistan, an urban-type settlement in Uzbekistan
 Qarluq, Iran (disambiguation), several locations in Iran

See also

Karlik (disambiguation)

Language and nationality disambiguation pages